Edward Hopkins (1600–1657) was an English-American settler and politician.

Edward Hopkins may also refer to:
Edward Hopkins (MP) (c. 1675–1736), Member of the Parliament of Ireland and Chief Secretary for Ireland
Edward John Hopkins (1818–1901), English organist and composer
Edward Nicholas Hopkins (1855–1935), Canadian farmer, manufacturer and politician
Edward Washburn Hopkins (1857–1932), philologist
Ted Hopkins (born 1949), Edward "Ted" Hopkins, Australian rules footballer